Khurram Chohan (born 22 February 1980) is a Pakistani Canadian cricketer who represents the Canada national cricket team. Chohan had a career in Pakistan's domestic cricket league before he emigrated to Canada. He played for the Lahore cricket teams and also represented Pakistan at under-19 level.

Chohan was included in Canada's squad for the World Cup Qualifiers in South Africa in early 2009 and proved one of their more consistent bowlers, taking up 15 wickets in the course of the tournament. He is mainly known for his fast-medium seamers.

References

External links
 

1980 births
Canadian cricketers
Canada One Day International cricketers
Canada Twenty20 International cricketers
Pakistani emigrants to Canada
Naturalized citizens of Canada
Living people
Pakistani cricketers
Lahore Whites cricketers
Lahore Blues cricketers
Punjabi people
Cricketers from Lahore